Rothmund is a German surname, derived from the Germanic male given name Hrodmund, from hrod meaning "fame" (found in names such as Robert, Roderick, Rudolph, Roland Rodney, and Roger) and mund meaning "protection" or "protector" (found in names such as Edmund, Cynemund, and Raymond). It may refer to:

August von Rothmund (1830–1906), German ophthalmologist; son of Franz Christoph von Rothmund
Franz Christoph von Rothmund (1801–1891), German surgeon; father of August von Rothmund
Toni Rothmund (1877–1956), German writer and journalist

See also
Rothmund–Thomson syndrome (RTS), an abnormal condition of the skin

German-language surnames